"In My Life" is rock song by Australian band Divinyls. It was released in 1984 from their second studio album What a Life! and charted within the top fifty on the Australian singles chart, peaking at number forty-seven.

Song information

"In My Life" was written by Christina Amphlett and Mark McEntee and was produced by Gary Langan, who had been brought in to work on the album What a Life! at Amphlett and McEntee's persuasion. Langan created an edgier rock sound for Divinyls with several tracks, in particular "In My Life".

"In My Life" proved not to be a major success in Australia, where it peaked at number forty-seven on the Kent Music Report top fifty singles chart. Nevertheless, Divinyls next single "Pleasure and Pain" became a big hit.

Track listing
Australian 7" Single
 "In My Life" - 3:43
 "Don't You Go Walking" (Remix) - 5:15

Charts

References

1984 singles
Divinyls songs
Songs written by Chrissy Amphlett
Songs written by Mark McEntee
1984 songs
Chrysalis Records singles